Rubus nivalis, commonly known as snow raspberry, is a species of flowering plant in the rose family. It is native to northwestern North America: British Columbia, Washington, Idaho, Oregon, and far northern California.

Rubus nivalis is a small, prickly shrub up to 15 cm (6 inches) tall, with stems creeping along the ground. Leaves are evergreen, sometimes simple (non-compound) but sometimes compound with 3 leaflets. Flowers are pink or magenta. Fruit is red with only 3-10 drupelets. It grows in forests that are shaded and moist.

References

External links
 
 
 
 Jepson manual Treatment
 University of Washington, Burke Museum

nivalis
Flora of British Columbia
Flora of the Northwestern United States
Plants described in 1832